Memories & Dust is the debut studio album by Australian singer-songwriter, Josh Pyke. It was released in March in 2007 and peaked at number 4 on the ARIA Charts and was certified platinum in 2020.

At the J Awards of 2007, the album was nominated for Australian Album of the Year.

At the ARIA Music Awards of 2007, the album was nominated for five awards, with Pyke winning ARIA Award for Best Adult Contemporary Album, Pyke and Connolly winning ARIA Award for Producer of the Year and Connolly winning ARIA Award for Engineer of the Year.

Reception

Bernard Zuel from Sydney Morning Herald described the music as evocative and moving and Pyke as "inventive" and "know[ing] how to construct music and lyrics into a form that is more than the sum of its parts

Noel Mengel from Courier Mail found that the songs had a "logical sequence," "each leading to the next and illuminating those around it." He praised "Someone Else's Town" for its "handsome string arrangement" and "Fed and Watered" as "bright and bouncy." Kathy McCabe from Daily Telegraph admired the melody and detail of the lyrics and music and described "Vibrations in Air" as "goose-bumpingly beautiful."

Track listing 

Some editions were also sold with Feeding the Wolves as a bonus CD.

UK Version 
The UK had an alternate track listing.

Charts

Certifications

Release history

References 

2007 debut albums
Josh Pyke albums
Ivy League Records albums
ARIA Award-winning albums